Ohio wine (or "Ohioan wine") refers to wine made from grapes grown in the U.S. state of Ohio.  Historically, this has been wine grown from native American species of grapes (such as Vitis labrusca), not European wine grapes, although hybrid and Vitis vinifera grapes are now common in Ohio.  As of 2018 there were 280 commercial wineries operating in Ohio, and there are five designated American Viticultural Areas partially or completely located within the state.

History

The southern shore of Lake Erie falls within the global "Pinot Belt," which also runs through Burgundy and the Willamette Valley, which according to Wine Enthusiast means Ohio has "innate potential for attention-worthy wines".

Wine has been produced in Ohio since 1823 when Nicholas Longworth planted the first Alexander and Isabella grapes in the Ohio River Valley.  In 1825, Longworth planted the first Catawba grapes in Ohio.  Others soon planted Catawba in new vineyards throughout the state and by 1860, Catawba was the most important grape variety in Ohio.  At this time, Ohio produced more wine than any other state in the country, and Cincinnati was the most important city in the national wine trade. Golden Eagle winery on Middle Bass Island housed America's largest winery in 1872. As in many other states, Prohibition in the United States destroyed the Ohio wine industry, which has struggled to recover.  As of 2018 Ohio was the 6th-largest wine producer in the United States.

In Fall of 2011 Kent State University at Ashtabula became the first university in the state to offer programs in viticulture and enology.

Wholly or partially in Ohio are the American viticulture areas Lake Erie, Isle St. George, Grand River Valley, Ohio River Valley, and Loramie Creek.

Reception
In 2018 Wine Enthusiast called out Ferrante Winery, Firelands Winery, Gervasi Vineyard, Meranda-Nixon Winery, and Valley Vineyards as "wineries to know" in the state. That same year, RewardExpert analyzed wine ratings on CellarTracker and identified Heritage Vineyards in Warsaw in Coshocton County as having the highest-rated wine in the country.

Wine industry
Many wineries in Ohio are members of the Ohio Wine Producers Association.  The site includes resources for produces and consumers, including an extensive calendar of Ohio Wine events.  It also includes the Ohio Wine Hall of Fame.

There are six "wine trails" in the state, including the Lake Erie Shores and Islands Trail, the Lake Erie Vines and Wines Trail, the Canal Country Trail, the Appalachian Wine Trail (Southeast Ohio bordering West Virginia), the Ohio River Valley Wine Trail (along the Ohio River in Cincinnati to Dayton), and the Capital City Trail (Columbus area).

Wineries in Ohio

The following wineries and vineyards operate wholly or principally in Ohio.

See also
American wine

References

External links
Ohio Wine Producers Association
Ohio wineries 
Ohio Wines

 
Wine regions of the United States by state